"Somebody Loves You Baby (You Know Who It Is)" is a song by American singer Patti LaBelle. It was written and produced by Bunny Sigler and Eugene "Lambchops" Curry for her 1991 studio album, Burnin'. The song reached number two on the US Billboard Hot R&B/Hip-Hop Songs in early 1992. Like her previous single "Feels Like Another", "Somebody Loves You..." was also shot at the Apollo Theater. 

Rapper Plies later sampled the song for his track, "Somebody (Loves You)" off his second release, Definition of Real. The song is featured in series "Happily Divorced" sung by one of the characters.

Credits and personnel 
Credits adapted from the liner notes of Gems.

Patti LaBelle – executive producer, vocals
Eugene "Lambchops" Curry – co-producer, writer
Bunny Sigler – producer, writer
Michael Stokes – executive  A&R

Charts

References

1991 singles
Patti LaBelle songs
Soul ballads
Songs written by Bunny Sigler
Pop ballads
1990s ballads